Tomb is the third studio album by American musician Angelo de Augustine, released on Asthmatic Kitty on January 11, 2019. De Augustine collaborated with Thomas Bartlett on all 12 tracks. It is an alternative folk album about a breakup and its emotional fallout.

Themes and influences
Most of the songs were written after a breakup de Augustine experienced at the end of 2017. The subsequent pain and loss is the principal theme of the album. He draws a comparison between the breakup and his father leaving home.

Track listing

Critical reception

The album received generally positive reviews from critics. Writing for Under the Radar, Michael James Hall said that "(Tomb) is a remarkable, quietly powerful, and astoundingly beautiful album from an artist who now deserves to take his place among his influences". Margaret Farrell of Pitchfork proclaimed that "despite the album's dark, damp, sepulchral title, light manifests numerous times on Tomb. In the dizzying chime of his careful fingerpicking and high-pitched howls, De Augustine captures love's bright blaze". Writing for Exclaim!, Laura Stanley said that "while the title suggests De Augustine's third full-length album is full of sepulchral tones, Tomb has a lightness to it. De Augustine is immersed in love throughout, so while he's working through tough stuff, we are ultimately left with the feeling that De Augustine is growing stronger and that love will bloom again".

Personnel
Performance
 Angelo de Augustine – vocals, background vocals, bandurria, guitar, handclapping, piano, whistle, Wurlitzer piano
 Thomas Bartlett – Drum Machine, Drums (Snare), Engineer, Floor Tom, Handclapping, Mixing, Muted Piano, Piano, Producer, Synthesizer, Wurlitzer Piano

Technical personnel
 Josh Bonati – Mastering, Master Lacquer
 Angelo De Augustine – composer, paintings

References 

2019 albums
Angelo De Augustine albums